The 2008 American Handball Women's Youth Championships took place in Blumenau from September 2 – 6.

Results

Final standing

References 
 brasilhandebol.com.br

2008 in handball